A Luxembourg Depository Receipt (LDR) is a certificate which represents the purchase, or ownership, of foreign assets which are deposited in a Luxembourg-based account. An LDR functions in much the same way as a global depository receipt (GDR). LDRs may represent ownership of either an underlying number of shares or a notional amount of bonds.

Luxembourg Depository Receipts are particularly useful where an institution wants to ensure safe keeping of assets, i.e., in Luxembourg, but needs a specific national or regional banks' expertise in handling a variety of transactions (such as the sale of shares to local markets).

Prices of LDRs are often close to the value of the related instrument but they are traded and settled independently and often in smaller lots (particularly in the case of bonds).

Trading and settlement of LDRs is difficult to quantify as the use of local markets makes analyzing the size of this market quite difficult.

References

Depositary receipts
Structured finance